Dhaulana is one of the three Tehsils of Hapur district of Uttar Pradesh, state of India. It was created on 28 September 2011 and comprises 91 villages. Dhaulana lies in Satha Chaurasi regions of Western Uttar Pradesh house to Sisodiya Rajputs.

History 
Dhaulana enjoys a great part in Indian History especially in British Era, like with the 1857 revolt in the city of Meerut being the origin of the revolution against the East India Company. The Rajputs of Satha- Chaurasi also left their home to be a part of this revolt and Thakur Jhanku Singh was the man leading the crowd. While protesting against East India Company the crowd went to the police station and burned down the whole thing, Station IN charged Mubarak Ali, who would then have to run away and hide in nearby villages to save his life and he later reached Meerut and informed Senior British Officials about the situation in Dhaulana.

Thakur Jhanku Singh along with thousand of Rajput men moved towards Delhi and upon reaching Red Fort he tore the symbol of East India Company waving and waved his Saffron Pagdi instead. This action was a humiliation to the East India Company and they were deeply humiliated. The East India Company along with large troop and Military Tanks reached Dhaulana and arrested 14 peoples named in the action including Thakur Makhan Gehlot, Thakur Chandan Singh, Thakur Jiraj Singh, Thakur Daulat Singh, Thakur Sumer Singh, Thakur Sahib Singh, Thakur Kiddha Singh, Thakur Maharaj Singh, Thakur Durga Singh, Thakur Jiya Singh, Thakur Masav Singh, Thakur Wajir Singh and Lala Jhankumal Singhal.

Lala Jhanku Mal was a trader and was not a part of this revolt but as the main men Thakur Jhanku Singh was not caught by them hence they arrested Jhankumal instead to install fear among the local public. Later East India Company hang all these patriots till death and buried them with dead dogs.

References 

Cities and towns in Hapur district